Peek or PEEK may refer to:

Computing
 Peek (data type operation), an operation on data types such as stacks and queues
 PEEK and POKE, the low-level commands of the BASIC programming language
 Peek (mobile Internet device), an email-only mobile handheld device
 Peek, an ADABAS/NATURAL utility
 Peek (software), a Linux application to create GIF animations

People with the surname
 Antwan Peek (born 1979), American footballer
 Ben Peek (born 1976), Australian author
 Bertrand Meigh Peek (1891–1965), British astronomer
 Burton Peek (1872–1960), former president of Deere & Company
 Dan Peek (1950–2011), musician
 Frank William Peek (1881–1933), American electrical engineer and inventor
 Kim Peek (1951–2009), American savant
 Paul Peek (1937–2001), musician
 Paul Peek (politician) (1904–1987)
 Peek baronets
 Henry Peek (1825–1898), 1st Baronet, importer of spices and tea
 Cuthbert Peek (1855–1901), 2nd Baronet, astronomer and meteorologist

Other uses
 Polyether ether ketone (PEEK), the family of thermoplastic resins
 Peek, Oklahoma, a US ghost town
 Peek (crater), a small lunar impact crater in the northern part of the Mare Smythii near the eastern limb of the Moon

See also
 Peak (disambiguation)